Jonathan A. Goldstein (1929–2004) was a biblical scholar and author who wrote for the Anchor Bible Series. He was the author of books on I Maccabees and II Maccabees, as well as a book about competing religions in the ancient world.

Goldstein studied at the Jewish Theological Seminary and earned a bachelor's degree and master's degree at Harvard University. He then earned a doctorate from Columbia University and taught history there for two years. He then taught at the University of Iowa from 1962 to 1997, and lived in Iowa City until his death in 2004.

Bibliography

External links

See also
Anchor Bible Series
I Maccabees
II Maccabees
The Temple Scroll

1929 births
2004 deaths
Jewish American writers
Jewish biblical scholars
American biblical scholars
American Conservative Jews
Harvard University alumni
Columbia University alumni
University of Iowa faculty
Jewish Theological Seminary of America alumni
20th-century Jewish biblical scholars
20th-century American male writers
20th-century American Jews
21st-century American Jews